Vomeronasal type-1 receptor 1 is a protein that in humans is encoded by the VN1R1 gene.

Function 

Pheromones are chemical signals that elicit specific behavioral responses and physiologic alterations in recipients of the same species. The protein encoded by this gene is similar to pheromone receptors and is primarily localized to the olfactory mucosa. An alternate splice variant of this gene is thought to exist, but its full length nature has not been determined.

Ligands

 Hedione
 Iso E Super

References

Further reading 

 
 
 
 
 

G protein-coupled receptors